UMAR, an acronym which stands for Alternative and Answer Women's Union in Portuguese (União de Mulheres Alternativa e Resposta), is a Portuguese women's rights organization founded in 1976.

From 1976 to 1989, the acronym originally stood for Antifascist and Revolutionary Women's Union (União de Mulheres Antifascistas e Revolucionárias). In 1989, the organization changed its name to Movement for the Social Emancipation of the Portuguese Women (Movimento para a Emancipação Social das Mulheres Portuguesas) and again, in 1999, to the name it currently holds.

The organization was founded by members of the far-left party People's Democratic Union (nowadays part of the Left Bloc), but was always completely autonomous from the party.

See also 

 Women in Portugal
 List of women's organizations

References 

Feminist organisations in Portugal
1976 establishments in Portugal
Organizations established in 1976